Eduardo Luján Manera (22 August 1944 – 15 August 2000) was an Argentine football defender, and a manager who won the Argentine Primera with Estudiantes de La Plata as player and manager. He was banned from football for 20 games by the Argentine Football Association and sent to prison for a month following assaults on AC Milan players in the 1969 Intercontinental Cup final.

Titles

 As a player
Metropolitano in 1967 with Estudiantes de la Plata
Copa Libertadores de América (3): 1968-1969-1970
Copa Intercontinental : 1968
Copa Interamericana : 1969

 As a coach
 Nacional  in 1983 with Estudiantes de la Plata
Primera B Nacional' in 1995 with Estudiantes de La Plata

External links
Eduardo Luján Manera – Argentine Primera managerial statistics at Fútbol XXI  
Noticia Clarín: obituary 
Noticia Clarín: Manera at Deportivo Español 
 
Estudiantes Campeón 
Vélez-Universitario 
Diario Hoy: obituary 

1944 births
2000 deaths
Argentine footballers
Argentina international footballers
Argentine Primera División players
Estudiantes de La Plata footballers
Association football defenders
Argentine football managers
Club Atlético Los Andes managers
Estudiantes de La Plata managers
Once Caldas managers
Deportivo Cali managers
Club Atlético Atlanta managers
Club Atlético Platense managers
Club Necaxa managers
Talleres de Córdoba managers
Club Atlético Vélez Sarsfield managers
Newell's Old Boys managers
Club Universitario de Deportes managers
Guatemala national football team managers
Independiente Santa Fe managers
1989 Copa América managers
Paraguay national football team managers
Expatriate football managers in Paraguay
Expatriate football managers in Guatemala
AC Avignonnais players
Sportspeople from Entre Ríos Province